Archibald Philip ("Archie") Douglas (7 June 1867 – 24 January 1953) was an English first-class cricketer active 1887–1912 who played for Middlesex and Surrey in England; and in India for the Europeans. He was born in Norwood Green, Middlesex; died in Taunton.

References

1867 births
1953 deaths
English cricketers
Middlesex cricketers
Surrey cricketers
Europeans cricketers